The Battle of Lipany (in Czech: Bitva u Lipan), also called the Battle of Český Brod, was fought at Lipany 40 km east of Prague on 30 May 1434 and virtually ended the Hussite Wars. An army of Moderate Hussite (or Calixtine) nobility and Catholics, called the Bohemian League, defeated the radical Taborites and Orphans (or Sirotci) led by Prokop the Great, the overall commander, and by Jan Čapek of Sány, the cavalry commander.

The battle 
The radicals set up a Wagenburg on a strategically advantageous hill, and both armies stood against each other for some time. An attempt by the Calixtines/Utraquists to negotiate and resolve the conflict peacefully failed due to irreconcilable positions of the two sides. Three days after the unsuccessful negotiations, the Leaguers advanced to the radicals' encampment; although the following mutual cannonade was harmless due to distance between the two armies, to the surprise of the radicals the Leaguers began to retreat with all their wagons.

Thinking that the enemy was fleeing, the radicals' commanders opened the Wagenburg to attack the Leaguers' formation, not knowing that the retreat was a trick to draw them out of the Wagenburg. As the radicals approached the Leaguers' army, the Leaguers stopped and began to fire from their wagons. At the same time, the Leaguers' heavy cavalry, which had been hidden near the radicals' camp, undertook a surprise attack from the side and penetrated into the open Wagenburg. The radicals' army quickly collapsed and the commander of the Orphans' cavalry, Čapek of Sány, fled with all his men to the nearby town of Kolín.

The battle now changed into a massacre of the lightly equipped radical forces. Both Prokop the Great and Prokůpek (Prokop the Lesser) were killed, holding "the last stand" at the wagons. Some prominent leaders of the radicals, including Jan Roháč of Dubá, were captured, but about 700 ordinary soldiers who surrendered after promises of renewed military service were burned to death in nearby barns.

Aftermath 
As a consequence of the battle, the Taborite army was markedly weakened, and the Orphans virtually ceased to exist as a military force. The road towards acceptance of the Compacts of Basel was now open, and it was signed on 5 July 1436 in Jihlava. The next month, Sigismund was accepted as King of Bohemia by all major factions. Sigismund commented on the Battle of Lipany that "the Bohemians could be overcome only by Bohemians."

The last formation of Taborites under the command of Jan Roháč of Dubé was besieged at his castle Sion near Kutná Hora. It was then captured by Sigismund's forces, and on 9 September 1437 Roháč, still refusing to accept Sigismund as his King, was hanged in Prague. 

With the wars officially over, many Hussites were now hired as mercenaries by the same countries whom they had sacked during the pillaging expeditions they had called "beautiful rides."

See also 
 Luděk Marold - Painter of the Marold's Panorama, which depicts this battle.

External links 

The Battles of the Hussite Wars
 Bellum.cz – Battle of Lipany 30th May 1434

1434 in Europe
Lipany 1434
Lipany
Lipany 1434
Lipany
Prokop the Great
History of the Central Bohemian Region